La Fayette is a general purpose stealth frigate of the French Navy (Marine Nationale). She is the second French vessel named after the 18th century general Marquis de Lafayette. She is the lead ship of the class.

Upgrade
La Fayette began a major life extension upgrade in October 2021. The upgrade is designed to permit the frigate to operate through the 2020s and into the 2030s and incorporates the addition of hull-mounted sonar, improved point air defence systems, the CANTO anti-torpedo countermeasures system, as well as the capacity to deploy the latest variant of the Exocet anti-ship missile. The frigate returned to sea for testing of her new systems in May 2022 and was declared fully operational again in November 2022. She is to remain active until 2031.

Career Post-Upgrade

In February 2023, the frigate was tasked to initiate an around the world deployment accompanying the helicopter assault ship Dixmude. The deployment was to involve a series of exercises and port calls enroute. According to the commander of the mission, Captain Emmanuel Mocard, La Fayette possesses improved sea-keeping and endurance following her upgrade and the scope of the planned deployment would not have been feasible prior to her refit.

Gallery

In popular culture
 La Fayette was featured in the 1995 James Bond film GoldenEye, as the site for the unveiling of the Eurocopter Tiger, which is subsequently stolen in the film. The 1997 video game based on the movie, GoldenEye 007, released for the Nintendo 64, includes a hostage rescue mission on board La Fayette. This mission was reimagined for the game's 2010 remake, developed for the Wii and Nintendo DS consoles, as well as its own 2011 remaster, GoldenEye 007: Reloaded, available for the PlayStation 3 and Xbox 360 platforms.

References

La Fayette-class frigates
Frigates of France
1992 ships
Ships built in France